The Science of Fictions is a 2019 Indonesian drama film written, directed, produced, and edited by Yosep Anggi Noen. Veteran theater actor Gunawan Maryanto stars as a man whose tongue gets cut off after discovering a film crew shooting a fake moon landing. For his performance, Maryanto won many awards, including the Citra Award for Best Actor and Maya Award for Best Actor in a Leading Role.

Synopsis 
During the 1960s, the quiet Siman encounters a foreign film crew filming a fake moon landing in a desolate part of Indonesia. His tongue is cut out and after this traumatising incident he loses himself in dreams of becoming an astronaut. His muteness and strange, slow-motion gait make him a target for scorn and exploitation. Simultaneously, in the village, a colorful soldier parodies Suharto.

Cast 

 Gunawan Maryanto as Siman
 Ecky Lamoh as the actor
 Yudi Ahmad Tajudin as Ndapuk & Tupon
 Alex Suhendra as Wanto & Gun
 Lukman Sardi as Jumik
 Rusini as Sinak
 Asmara Abigail as Nadiyah
 Marissa Anita as kiosk owner
 Rachel Saraswati as Ermi
 Pritt Timothy as Hendri

Production 
Noen conceived the idea for the film in 2012 while visiting Gumuk Pasir, an area near Parangkusumo Beach in Bantul, Yogyakarta. The landscape reminded him of the moon's surface and gave inspired him to write a story set in the 1960s, during which the first ever moon landing was a major public interest. It took Noen seven years to realize the idea into a feature film, a time span which he spent to develop the screenplay and seek funding.

Release 
The film had its world premiere at the Locarno Film Festival in Switzerland in August 2019. It went through months of festival runs abroad before making it to Indonesian theaters in December 2020.

Reception 
Upon its screening at Locarno, Marta Balaga wrote for Cine Europa that the film "can’t quite match its ambitions, failing to keep up the interest and brought down by a terrible, sentimental ending" and that "there is no shaking off a certain feeling of melancholy about the entire thing." Reviewing the film for Screen Anarchy, Martin Cudlac was more positive, calling it "a socio-political parable for the age of fake news" that "approaches a hot topic from a slapsticky angle although satire never breaks through as Anggi Noen keeps tight control over the film´s message." Local critic Dwiki Aprinaldi of Cinema Poetica was more critical of the film. Calling Noen's screenplay "abstract", he wrote that the film "seems to say much while in reality it is just a pretentious oration that revolves around itself".

Accolades

References

External links 

 

Indonesian drama films
2010s Indonesian-language films
Citra Award winners
Maya Award winners
2019 drama films
Films about fraud
Films about hoaxes